Oberwachtmeister (OWm) (ge: for senior master-sentinel; senior watch-master) is in Austria and Switzerland a military rank of non-commissioned officers (NCO). Besides Austria and Switzerland today, the rank was also used for example in Germany and Russia.

Austria 
{| style="border:1px solid #8888aa; background-color:#f7f8ff; padding:5px; font-size:95%; margin: 0px 12px 12px 0px; float:right; width:250px"
|+
|-----
| bgcolor="#efefef" colspan=2 align="center"| Oberwachtmeister in Austria
|-----
| align="center" colspan=2 style="border-bottom:2px solid gray;font-size:smaller" | 

|-----
| bgcolor="#efefef" | Rank insignia || bgcolor="#dfefff" | Austrian Bundesheer
|-----
| bgcolor="#efefef" | Introduction|| bgcolor="#dfefff" | 1965
|-----
| bgcolor="#efefef" | Rank group|| bgcolor="#dfefff" | NCOs (de: [[Unteroffizier#Austria|Unteroffiziere)]]
|-----
| bgcolor="#efefef" | Army / Air Force|| bgcolor="#dfefff" | Oberwachtmeister
|-----
| bgcolor="#efefef" | Navy|| bgcolor="#dfefff" | no equivalent|-----
| bgcolor="#efefef" rowspan=2| Lower:Higher:|| bgcolor="#dfefff" | Wachtmeister
|-----
| bgcolor="#efefef" bgcolor="#dfefff" | Stabswachtmeister
|-----
| bgcolor="#efefef" | NATOequivalent || bgcolor="#dfefff" | OR-6
|-----
|}Oberwachtmeister is in the Austrian Bundesheer the second lowest NCO-rank (assignment group M BUO 2 / professional NCO; respectively M ZUO 2 / longer-serving volunteer). The Oberwachtmeister will be normally deployed as leader (Austrian: Kommandant) of a squad (8 to 13 soldiers).

During United Nations missions and in NATO Partnership for Peace the rank Oberwachtmeister will be designated in English with Staff Sergeant (SSG) and is equivalent to NATO-Rang code OR-6.

See also
 Ranks of the Austrian Bundesheer

 Germany 
In the German army ground forces the designation of the OR6-Oberfeldwebel rank of Cavalry and Artillery was the «Oberwachtmeister» until 1945.

 See also
 World War II German Army ranks and insignia

 Nationale People’s Army 
In the GDR National People's Army (NPA) the OR6-rank «Oberwachtmeister» was replaced by the universal rank designation Oberfeldwebel. The equivalent rank of the Volksmarine (en: GDR Navy) was the Obermeister of the Volksmarine.

 See also
Ranks of the National People's Army

«Oberwachtmeister» was also a German police and justice rank.

Netherlands

 Switzerland 

In the Military of Switzerland the Oberwachtmeister (Obwm, Sergent-chef, Sergente capo) is a NCO-rank (NATO-Code: OR-6). The rank is higher than the rank Wachtmeister, and lower than Feldweibel.

Until the so-called Army reform XXI (with effect from January 1, 2004) the rank was regular assigned to the Zugführer-Stellvertreter (en: deputy platoon leader).

However, the promotion to Oberwachtmeister might be possible after successfully having finished an additional trainings course. The level of that course succeeds the squad leader level. The Oberwachtmeister grade is in principle a transition rank to the lieutenant promotion.

In United Nations missions and in NATO Partnership for Peace the rank Oberwachtmeister will be designated in English with Sergeant First Class (SFC), and is equivalent to NATO-Rang code OR-6.

 See also
⇒ Military ranks of the Swiss Armed Forces

 References 

 Die Streitkräfte der Republik Österreich, 1918-1968'', Heeresgeschichtliches Museum, Militärwissenschaftliches Institut, 1968.

Military ranks of Austria
Austro-Hungarian Army
Military ranks of Germany
Military ranks of Switzerland